Budapest College of Management (Hungarian: Általános Vállalkozási Főiskola) business and management training college located in Budapest, Hungary. The college was established in 1996.

Courses 
Some of the courses offered by this college are—
 Undergraduate courses
 Business Administration and Management
 International Business       
 Public Services
 International Relations
 Social Sciences
 Post-graduate courses
 Business Development
 International Relations
Non-degree programs
 Preparatory Program
 Professional Training Courses

On 1 January 2015 Budapest College of Management merged with International Business School, Budapest.

References

External links 
 

Educational institutions established in 1996
1996 establishments in Hungary